"When Love Gets a Hold of You" is a song written by Jon Randall, Jessi Alexander and Gary Nicholson, and recorded by American country music singer Reba McEntire.  It was released in April 2011 as the third single from her album All the Women I Am.

Critical reception
The song has received positive reviews from critics. Blake Boldt from Engine 145 gave the song a "thumbs up," saying the "spaghetti Western-meets-Pulp Fiction vibe, will likely stand out in the crowd of loud summertime anthems" and calling the song "a solid base hit for the Hall of Famer." Bobby Peacock from Roughstock gave the song 4 out of 5 stars, calling it "unmistakably Reba and unmistakably a hit," and telling fans to "look for this one to bring (Reba) back into the single digits once more."

Promotion
McEntire performed the song on the 46th Academy of Country Music Awards, after which she received a long standing ovation from the crowd. McEntire was also hosting the awards show with Blake Shelton. This performance is used as the song's music video.

Chart performance

References

2011 singles
Reba McEntire songs
Song recordings produced by Dann Huff
Songs written by Jon Randall
Songs written by Jessi Alexander
Songs written by Gary Nicholson
Big Machine Records singles
2010 songs